Roberto Iancu (born 26 March 1982) is a Romanian former professional footballer who played as a midfielder. In 1998, Iancu and Nicolae Mitea were taken by coach Ionuț Chirilă on a one-week trial at FC Barcelona, but despite leaving a good impression, they did not sign a contract because of some problems with their sports agent.

References

1982 births
Living people
Footballers from Bucharest
Romanian footballers
Association football midfielders
Liga I players
Liga II players
FC Progresul București players
CS Concordia Chiajna players
FC Universitatea Cluj players
AS Voința Snagov players